Racso Jugarap (born January 15, 1989) is a Filipino Belgian wire artist from General Santos, Philippines.

Early life 
Racso Jugarap, born in 1989, had a head start in art – he was the youngest son of a jewelry designer. As a result, he grew up with not only an inextricable connection with art crafting and creative design, him playing and freely experimenting with the tools in his father's workshop cultivated creative ideas in his mind. During that particular time of higher education endeavor, he had already been commissioned to do design pieces for hotels and business establishments. That experience sharpened then duly broadened his creativity, allowed him to explore a wide range of materials to craft art pieces, and showed him that there are endless and exciting possibilities for art crafting, art creating, and art designing.

Works 
Racso Jugarap is mainly self-taught with extensive experimentations with the material, the artist in Racso understood how materials behave—weaving each strand of various wires into organic and asymmetric shapes using the most minimal tool available to him. Curves have always been a crucial element in the artist's works, biomorphic and organic shapes.

Wearable arts and collaborations 
The artist also shows a fascination with the fashion world as he created his series Icarus, which are different types of wearable pieces made from metal wires.Wearable art He also collaborated with brands such as Guerlain and Tomorrowland Festival in his career.

Book 
Black and White Reasons For My Carpal Tunnel Syndrome- A Photobook (2020)

TV shows 
Snack Masters Season 1 Episode 4 With Sofie Dumont, Patrick Aubrion Hosted by Koen Wauters.

Exhibitions

Solo exhibitions 
 2022 European Commission (Lobby Show) Brussels, Belgium
 2021 Frederick Mouraux Gallery, Brussels Belgium (Duo)
 2020 Art Forum, Antwerp Belgium
 2019 Noon Gallery, Evere Belgium
 2016 Les Expos du 130, Brussels Belgium

Group exhibitions 
 2022 S.M.A.K. Museum, Gent Belgium. The Plinth
 2021 Gallerie 208, Paris France
 2021 Expo Bonheiden, Bonheiden Belgium
 2021 GURU Fair, Paris France
 2021 Chausee des Arts, Auderghem Belgium
 2021 Affordable Art Fair, Hamburg Germany
 2021 Art Muc Munich, Germany
 2020 Balthasar, Brussels Belgium
 2017 Soirée à la Rue de l'Abattoir, Tamines, Belgium
 2019 Chausee des Arts, Auderghem Belgium
 2019 Ten Gallery, Knokke Belgium
 2019 Akademy, Kortrijk Belgium
 2019 Memojacqs Gallerym Brussels, Belgium
 2018 Luna Rosa Gallery, Brussels Belgium
 2018 Modern Shapes, Antwerp Belgium
 2018 Art Rotterdam, Rotterdam Netherlands
 2017 Cocoon, Brussels Belgium
 2017 Palais 12 All4Home, Brussels Belgium
 2017 Intirio, Gent, Belgium
 2017 Maison et Objet, Paris France
 2016 Les Memoire des Jacqmottes, Belgium

Notable collector 
The Weeknd, Abel Makkonen Tesfaye, a Canadian singer, songwriter, and actor. 

Galila Berzalai Hollander, a prominent Belgian socialite with a reputable discernment and taste for the arts.

References 

Artists from General Santos
Living people
1989 births
20th-century Filipino artists
21st-century Filipino artists